Hyphydrus loriae  is a species of beetles of the family Dytiscidae.

Description
Pronotum and elytra are blackish, while legs and antennae are reddish. These water beetles have oval, flattened and streamlined bodies adapted for aquatic life.

Distribution
This species can be found in Papua New Guinea.

References
 Catalogue of life
 Universal Biological Indexer
 Synopsis of the described Coleoptera of the World
  Landesmuseum
 Revision des Dytiscidae de la region Indo-Sino-Malaise

Dytiscidae
Beetles described in 1892